ECWA Bingham University is a Nigerian university.

ECWA started planning for the university in 2003. A charter was granted by the Nigerian University Commission in 2005. Lectures commenced in 2006. The university has its permanent campus on the outskirts of Abuja (the Nigerian capital) in New Karu, Nasarawa State and has occupied it since 3 March 2008. The University Teaching Hospital is located in Jos, Plateau (state). Accommodation for students is on campus.

Courses
ECWA Bingham University offers courses such as 
 Business Administration
 Economics
 Mass Communication
 Biochemistry
 Microbiology
 English
 Medicine and Surgery (MBBS)
 Sociology
 Political Science
 Computer Science
 Accounting
 Mathematics and Statistics
 Physics
 Chemistry
 Anatomy
 Physiology
 Law
 Public Health

Administration

The pro-chancellor is Professor Gwamna Dogara Far.

The late Prof. A.T. Gana was the first vice chancellor of the university. The current vice chancellor is Prof. William Barnabas Qurix.

References

Universities and colleges in Nigeria
Educational institutions established in 2005
2005 establishments in Nigeria
Private universities and colleges in Nigeria
Nasarawa State